St. Patrick Cathedral is the cathedral of the Catholic Church located in Fort Worth, Texas, United States. It is a parish of the Diocese of Fort Worth and the seat of its bishop.  Construction of St. Patrick's church began in 1888, and it was dedicated in 1892. It is listed along with nearby parish facilities on the National Register of Historic Places as the St. Patrick Cathedral Complex with the church building, the rectory, and St. Ignatius Academy regarded as contributing properties. The church and academy buildings are each recognized as Recorded Texas Historic Landmarks.

History
Starting in 1870, Father Vincent Perrier would visit the Catholics living in Fort Worth twice a year. They met in the Carrico family home.  Fort Worth's first Catholic parish was St. Stanislaus. Its church building was a frame structure on Throckmorton Street. In 1879, Father Thomas Loughrey, who by that time had been assigned as the pastor of St. Stanislaus, started a school for boys. Classes were held in the church until 1907, when the frame structure was torn down.

The present St. Patrick's church was built to the north of the old St. Stanislaus Church. The cornerstone was laid in 1888, and the church was dedicated in 1892. James J. Kane designed it in the Gothic Revival style. St. Patrick's was elevated to a co-cathedral in 1953 when Pope Pius XII changed the name of the Diocese of Dallas to the Diocese of Dallas-Fort Worth. Pope Paul VI divided the diocese and created the Diocese of Fort Worth on August 22, 1969. St. Patrick's was retained as the cathedral for the new diocese. It was added to the National Register of Historic Places in 1985.

In popular culture
The interior of the cathedral was filmed for a scene in the 1990 comedy film, Problem Child.

See also

List of Catholic cathedrals in the United States
List of cathedrals in the United States
National Register of Historic Places listings in Tarrant County, Texas
Recorded Texas Historic Landmarks in Tarrant County

References

External links

Roman Catholic Diocese of Fort Worth Official Site

Patrick, Fort Worth
Roman Catholic churches in Fort Worth, Texas
Churches on the National Register of Historic Places in Texas
National Register of Historic Places in Fort Worth, Texas
Second Empire architecture in Texas
Gothic Revival church buildings in Texas
Roman Catholic churches completed in 1892
19th-century Roman Catholic church buildings in the United States
Recorded Texas Historic Landmarks